MSM may refer to:

Arts, entertainment, and media
 Mainstream media, collective term for large, influential mass news sources
 Miami Sound Machine, an American band
 My Singing Monsters, a Canadian video game

Education

Degrees
 Master of Sacred Music
 Master of Science in Management

Institutions

Europe
 Maastricht School of Management, in the Netherlands
 Mercator School of Management, in Germany
 Department of Materials Science and Metallurgy, University of Cambridge, in the UK

United States
 Manhattan School of Music, New York City
 Marriott School of Management, Provo, Utah
 Missouri School of Mines and Metallurgy, former name of Missouri University of Science and Technology, Rolla, Missouri
 Morehouse School of Medicine, Atlanta, Georgia

Finance and economics
 Markov switching multifractal, a model of asset returns
 Muscat Securities Market, a stock exchange in Oman
 Method of simulated moments, in econometrics

Military
 Meritorious Service Medal (disambiguation), a military award in several nations
 Mine setting mode,  of a minesweeper

Organizations
 Militant Socialist Movement, a political party in Mauritius
 Multi Screen Media, former name of the Indian company Sony Pictures Networks

People
 M.Sm., the author abbreviation for Matilda Smith
 Divine Ms. M, American entertainer

Science and technology
 Methylsulfonylmethane, a chemical compound and dietary supplement
 Mobile Station Modem, a Qualcomm Snapdragon processor prefix, e.g. MSM8960
 .msm, file extension for a Microsoft Windows Merge Module
 Mens Sana Monographs, on medicine and mental health

Other uses
 Mechanically separated meat, a food product
 Men who have sex with men
 Modern Standard Mandarin, the Chinese lingua franca

See also

 Master-slave manipulator Mk 8 (MSM-8), a type of remote manipulator
 M. S. M. Aslam, Sri Lankan politician
 M. S. M. Anandan, Indian politician
 
 MSMS (disambiguation)